Arthur Piper may refer to:

 Arthur Lewis Piper (1883–1983), medical missionary in the Belgian Congo
 Arthur William Piper (1865–1936), judge of the Supreme Court of South Australia
 Arthur Maine Piper (1898-1989), geologist and researcher